Anastasiia Vladyslavivna Pavlova (born February 9, 1995) is a Ukrainian competitive archer. She has collected a career total of at least ten medals in major international competitions, spanning the World Indoor Championships, the European Games, the World Cup series, and the European Championships.

Career
Pavlova rose to prominence on the global archery scene at the 2014 World Indoor Championships in Nimes, France. There, she and her compatriots Lidiia Sichenikova and Veronika Marchenko powered past the German women (234–220) on a tactical 14-point advantage to capture the team recurve title (234–220). Pavlova also added the bronze to the trio's career treasury by ousting the neighboring Russia in a high-quality 5–4 shoot-off at the 2015 European Games in Baku, Azerbaijan.

Pavlova was selected to compete for the Ukrainian squad at the 2016 Summer Olympics in Rio de Janeiro, shooting in both individual and team recurve tournaments. Two months before her maiden Games, she helped her Ukrainian colleagues overcome the Estonian side from the semi-final match for one of three women's team spaces at the World Archery Cup meet in Antalya, Turkey. Pavlova opened the tournament by discharging a total of 630 points, 18 perfect tens, and 6 bull's eyes to lead the Ukrainian women for the twenty-ninth seed heading to the knockout draw from the classification round, along with the trio's cumulative score of 1,890. Sitting at eighth in the women's team recurve, Pavlova, along with Marchenko and Sichenikova, slipped out of their initial round match to a convincing 2–6 defeat from the ninth-seeded Japanese women. In the women's individual recurve, Pavlova successfully blanked Kazakhstan's Luiza Saidiyeva for a comfortable 6–0 victory in the opening round, before losing her subsequent match by a similar scoreline to the Taiwanese archer and team bronze medalist Tan Ya-ting.

She won the bronze medal in the women's recurve event at the 2022 European Indoor Archery Championships held in Laško, Slovenia. She also won the gold medal in the women's team recurve event.

References

External links
 

1995 births
Living people
Ukrainian female archers
People from Nova Kakhovka
Archers at the 2015 European Games
European Games medalists in archery
European Games bronze medalists for Ukraine
Olympic archers of Ukraine
Archers at the 2016 Summer Olympics
Archers at the 2019 European Games
Archers at the 2020 Summer Olympics
Sportspeople from Kherson Oblast
21st-century Ukrainian women